Taral may refer to:

Fred Taral, American Hall of Fame jockey
Taral Hicks, actress and musician
Taral Wayne, Canadian science fiction fan artist
Taral, Arkansas, an unincorporated community in Pope County, Arkansas